Teflurane (INN, USAN, code name Abbott 16900) is a halocarbon drug which was investigated as an inhalational anesthetic but was never marketed. Its clinical development was terminated due to a high incidence of cardiac arrhythmias in patients, similarly to the cases of halopropane and norflurane.

Chemistry 
Teflurane is 2-bromo-1,1,1,2-tetrafluoroethane, a haloalkane.  It is a gas at standard conditions.  The compound is chiral.

See also
 Aliflurane
 Roflurane
 Synthane

References

General anesthetics
Organobromides
Organofluorides
GABAA receptor positive allosteric modulators
Trifluoromethyl compounds